Bian Zhongyun (1916, Wuwei County, China – 5 August 1966, Beijing) was a deputy principal at the Experimental High School Attached to Beijing Normal University, in Beijing, China. She was attracted to the Chinese Communist Party during the Sino-Japanese War and joined the party in 1941, and before working for the high school in Beijing, she worked at an editor for the People's Daily then located in rural Hebei.

Cultural revolution 

She became the first victim of the Cultural Revolution in 1966 the early days of Beijing's "Red August", where she was beaten to death with wooden sticks by a group of students, led by local student Red Guard leader Song Binbin. Prior to her death, Bian had been the party leader at the school. In March 1966, after an earthquake near Beijing, the school told students that they should run out of the classroom as soon as possible if another earthquake occurred. Some students asked Bian if they should carry the portrait of Mao in their classrooms. She did not answer the question directly, only repeated that they should run out of the classroom as soon as possible, and was therefore accused of opposing Chairman Mao. Later, she was further denounced as a "counter-revolutionary revisionist" by Song's group of Red Guards.

Death 
Bian's husband, Wang Jingyao, has stated that he was informed by anonymous witnesses that the female students who delivered the final blow did not include Song Binbin, even though Song was the nominal leader of the group. Song has also stated that although she was one of the leading Red Guards in the school during the unrest, although claiming she did not participate in the killing of Bian Zhongyun. For several decades, witnesses, including Wang and Song, refused to openly name the students who were involved in the killing as they were politically connected individuals. In 2005, the daughter of Zhang Bojun, a prominent victim of the Cultural Revolution, wrote a book in which she finally named Deng Rong, the youngest daughter of Deng Xiaoping, as one of the perpetrators. In 2012, on his deathbed, Wang Jingyao finally confirmed that the students who delivered the final blow to his wife on 5 August 1966 included Liu Pingping, a daughter of Liu Shaoqi. Ironically, the Deng and Liu families would both become persecuted during the Cultural Revolution.

Legacy 
A documentary about her, Though I Am Gone, was released in 2006. It claims that Song, a student leader involved in the Red Guards in the school, was sent to the United States to study on government sponsorship and invited back to Beijing Normal University as a prominent alumna. Song's father, Song Renqiong was the mayor of Beijing and a high ranking member of the Chinese Communist Party, thereby immunising her from any responsibility (direct or indirect) for Bian's death.

See also 

 Red August
 Red Terror
 Wang Youqin

References

People persecuted to death during the Cultural Revolution
1916 births
1966 deaths
Educators from Anhui
People from Wuhu
Date of birth missing
Deaths by beating
Female murder victims
People murdered in Beijing